Listen to My Heart is the debut Japanese studio album (second overall) by South Korean singer BoA, released via Avex Trax on March 13, 2002. BoA worked with various songwriters and composers for the album, including Natsumi Watanabe, Kazuhiro Hara, Ken Harada and Akira. Musically, the album is primarily a pop record with influences from R&B.

Listen to My Heart saw breakthrough success for a Korean artist in Japan, where it became the first record by a Korean artist to achieve the number one position on the Oricon Albums Chart and to be certified million by the Recording Industry Association of Japan (RIAJ). It won Rock & Pop Album of the Year at the 17th Japan Gold Disc Awards while the title track of the same name received the Gold Award at the 44th Japan Record Awards. BoA's successful debut in the country is considered to have opened the door for Korean artists in the Japanese music market.

Numerous singles were spawned and promoted from Listen to My Heart. The album's first single, the Japanese version of her 2000 debut single "ID; Peace B", was released in May 2001 and marked her first release in the country. Five singles were released afterwards up until the album's release, including the title track which peaked at number five on the Oricon Singles Chart.

Track listing

Charts and sales

Weekly charts

Yearly charts

Sales and certifications

Singles

References

2002 albums
BoA albums
Avex Group albums